WRJB (95.9 FM) is a radio station licensed to serve Camden, Tennessee, United States.  The station is owned by Community Broadcasting Services, Inc. It airs a classic rock music format.  The station formerly known as Super 98 (98.3 MHz) made its first broadcast in 1976.

The station was assigned the WRJB call letters by the Federal Communications Commission.

On-air staff
Current on-air staff includes Dylan Powley, Jim Steele, Luke Crutchfield, Troy Redmond, and Bobby "Flash" Melton. Former on-air staff included Charlie Baylor, Terry "Hollywood" Hendrix, Jim Hart, Will Luther (1960s national voice talent for Pizza Hut and MasterCharge), Gary Powley, David Poehlein, "Crazy" Larry Nunnery, Dr. Mike Baloga, Marty Lange, Darrell Lynn, Kyle Dewberry, and Steve Sullivan.

References

External links
WRJB official website

RJB
Radio stations established in 1976
Benton County, Tennessee
1976 establishments in Tennessee